The Queensland Railways PB15 class locomotive is an old class of 4-6-0 steam engines operated by the Queensland Railways.

History
The design resulted from a need for more powerful engines for passenger trains. The PB15 Class engine was designed by Locomotive Engineer, Henry Horniblow and LW Piggott. Per Queensland Railway's classification system they were designated the PB15 class engine, P representing they were a passenger locomotive, the B that they had three driving axles and the 15 the cylinder diameter in inches. The PB15 engines were in essence identical to the B15 class engine.

The first PB15 engines were delivered by Walkers Limited, Maryborough in December 1899. By 1912, a total of 202 engines had been built by Walkers (122), Evans, Anderson, Phelan & Co (70), Kitson & Co (20) and Toowoomba Foundry (20). They were fitted with Stephenson valve gear. In May 1918, engine no. 411 was converted at North Ipswich Railway Workshops into a tank engine, the one off member of the 6D15 class engine. In March 1922 however, due to poor performance it was converted back to its original tender form.

In 1924 one example of the engine was built by North Ipswich Railway Workshops for the Aramac Shire Tramway. It was acquired by Queensland Railways in 1958.

In 1925/26, Walkers manufactured a further 30 improved PB15 Class locomotives. These engines of these wheel arrangement were fitted with larger tenders and Walschaerts valve gear. This earned this variant of the PB15 engines the nickname Walschaerts.

In 1932, a number of PB15 class locomotives attached to Ipswich depot were fitted with a second sandbox for rear sanding to assist with shunting work on the colliery branches. These types of engines were nos. 351, 508, 567, 574, 587, 591, and 750, the last mentioned being a Walschaert engines or 1924 type PB15 engine. Later, the rear sanding equipment attached to classmate engine No. 591 was removed and PB15 engine No. 525 was fitted in lieu.

Preservation
Five examples of these engines have been preserved:
444 is on display at the Workshops Rail Museum, Ipswich
448 is operational on the Queensland Pioneer Steam Railway, Swanbank  and has been named in preservation RV Armstrong after the society's late founding member. It could be classmate engine No. 446, but this is wrong.
454 is undergoing a major overhaul at the Bellarine Railway, Queenscliff, Victoria
732 is in storage at the Workshops Rail Museum, one of the 1924 Walschaert type engines
738 is on display at the Rosewood Railway Museum, Rosewood, one of the 1924 Walschaert type engines

References

External links

PB15 class Queensland's Railways Interest Group

Kitson locomotives
Railway locomotives introduced in 1899
PB15
Walkers Limited locomotives
3 ft 6 in gauge locomotives of Australia
4-6-0 locomotives